Cabre (Cabere, Cávere) is an extinct Arawakan language of Colombia. Speakers lived along the Teviare and Zama rivers among speakers of Western Nawiki (Upper Amazonian) languages, but not enough is known to classify it well. Gilij (see Campbell) cited:

References

Languages of Colombia
Arawakan languages

hr:Resígaro jezik
pms:Lenga resígaro